No. 50 (subtitled The Golden Anniversary Album) is a compilation album released by Australian country music singer Slim Dusty in April 1981. The album is Dusty's 50th album release and peaked at number 10 on the Kent Music Report, becoming his first top ten album.

Track listing
LP/Cassette

Weekly charts

Release history

References

Slim Dusty albums
1981 albums
EMI Records albums
Compilation albums by Australian artists